Kenneth Irons is a fictional supervillain. He is depicted as the person behind nearly every evil deed in the Top Cow series Witchblade.

Fictional character biography
Irons is the head of Irons International, businessman of the year of Fortune magazine and one of the ten richest men in the world. He made his fortune though drug trafficking, prostitution, slavery, and the arms industry. His one obsession is the Witchblade.

Irons was born in the mid-to-late 12th century during the reign of King Richard I and served as a leader of the Templar Knights in the Third Crusade. He and his son Gerard, along with a group of other Knights, made their way into a holy place where they found and drank from the Holy Grail, making them immortal.

In the late 19th century while on an archaeological dig in Greece, Irons discovered the Witchblade gauntlet and became obsessed with controlling the Witchblade and/or its host. When Sara Pezzini became the Witchblade's host, Irons turned his attention to her. His ambition came to an end when he was shot and killed by Sara's captain Joe Siry after Ian Nottingham and Excalibur stripped Irons immortality away from him. He also has a son named Geraun Irons who follows in his father's footsteps and recently returned from the Dead to antagonize Sara again.

Powers and abilities
After drinking from the Holy Grail, Irons became immortal and stopped aging. Irons possessed knowledge of magic spells and could also feel or sense magical energy. Irons was also a skilled swordsman and fighter due to his experiences with the Templar Knights. Iron's most potent weapons were his centuries of experience, his vast economic resources, and his influence over powerful underground organizations such as the Mafia and Yakuza.

In other media
Irons served as the main villain of the 2001-2002 live-action Witchblade television series.

References

Characters created by Marc Silvestri
Comics characters introduced in 1995
Fictional businesspeople
Image Comics male supervillains
Witchblade characters